Just for You is a 1952 American musical film starring Bing Crosby and Jane Wyman and the final motion picture to be directed by Elliott Nugent. It was nominated for Best Song at the 1953 Academy Awards. The film was based on the book Famous by Stephen Vincent Benét. Filming took place between October 22 and December 20, 1951. It is said that Judy Garland had originally been sent a script as she was being considered for the female lead, but she apparently decided not to proceed with the project. Location scenes were filmed at Lake Arrowhead, near San Bernardino, California and at Big Bear Lake in the San Bernardino National Forest.

Plot
Widower Jordan Blake (Bing Crosby) is a successful Broadway producer and songwriter, but he has been neglecting his teenaged children, Jerry (Robert Arthur) and Barbara (Natalie Wood).

In rehearsal with star and girlfriend Carolina Hill (Jane Wyman), he keeps Jerry waiting, then dismisses a song his son has written as trite. Jordan is also unaware that Jerry is hopelessly in love with Carolina, who has wedding plans of her own...but to Jordan.

Then when daughter Barbara ends up in night court with her governess, who has been arrested for a drunken disagreement with a police officer, Jordan realizes he needs to spend more time with his kids.

At the urging of Carolina, he takes both to a resort, not far from a finishing school that Barbara would love to attend. Without realizing that Alida De Bronkhart (Ethel Barrymore) is the headmistress there, Jordan tries to learn from Alida the best way to get a girl accepted at the exclusive school. He also performs an old vaudeville song for the trustees, causing his daughter great embarrassment.

Carolina has a heart-to-heart talk with young Jerry about being in love. He mistakenly believes Carolina means him when she mentions her intention to marry. Jerry is crushed when he learns on the radio that Carolina is engaged to his father. Heartbroken, he enlists in the Air Force and leaves home.

Time goes by. In wartime, Jordan does his part by performing on a USO tour of Alaska. He speaks from the heart about the highs and lows of raising children, unaware that his son is in the audience. They, along with Carolina, are eventually reunited.

Cast

Reception
The film had its New York premiere at the Capitol Theater on October 8, 1952.

Bosley Crowther of The New York Times was not impressed, writing that "Bing Crosby's well-known reputation as an amiable father of boys may have no bearing whatsoever on his new picture, Just for You, but it is notable that, in this song-plugged fable, he plays a father who has trouble with his son... Put this one down as an endeavor in a generous cause that fails to come off entirely because it lacks sharp direction—and a script. Elliott Nugent's staging and pacing is as rigid and uninspired as the stiff and conventional plotting in Mr.Carson's script. And the songs and song numbers, while pleasant, are nothing to set the screen on fire."

Variety was much happier with it at the New York preview, saying that "Just for You, a Bing Crosby–Jane Wyman musical which Paramount has set for national release in September, should prove a stout factor in bringing back that 'lost audience.' For this Technicolor film has a rousing, melodic score and a logical story well acted by a fine cast. With such basic ingredients, the picture will not only satisfy the 'under 35' trade but will recapture some of the older public who have temporarily lost the film-going habit... With fine material to work with, Crosby socks across one of his best portrayals."

Soundtrack
All the music was composed by Harry Warren with lyrics by Leo Robin.

"I'll Si-si Ya in Bahia" sung by Bing Crosby and chorus
"The Live Oak Tree" sung by Bing Crosby and girls' chorus
"Zing a Little Zong" sung by Bing Crosby and Jane Wyman
"On the 10:10 from Ten-Ten-Tennessee" sung by Bing Crosby and Ben Lessy
"Just for You" sung by Bing Crosby
"He's Just Crazy for Me"
"Call Me Tonight" sung by Bob Arthur and Leon Tyler, and again by Bing Crosby
"Checkin' My Heart" sung by Jane Wyman and chorus
"The Maiden of Guadalupe" sung by Jane Wyman and chorus

In addition to the songs featured in the film, two others were written for it. They were "Spring Fever" and "A Flight of Fancy"; they were used on the soundtrack as part of the background music.

Bing Crosby recorded six of the songs for Decca Records and these were issued on a 10" LP titled Selections from the Paramount Picture "Just for You". “Zing a Little Zong” was in the Billboard charts for six weeks with a peak position of #18. Crosby's songs were also included in the Bing's Hollywood series.

References

External links

1952 films
1952 musical films
American musical films
Paramount Pictures films
Films directed by Elliott Nugent
1950s English-language films
1950s American films